The Maîtrise en sciences (MSc) is a French degree in higher education accredited by the Conférence des Grandes Écoles and for owners of a Bachelor's degree or a first year of a Master's degree. Created in 2002, this degree certifies that the training is consistent with various quality criteria (selectivity, English language education, number of hours, length of program, research, etc..).

Presentation 

According to the rules of organization of training programs accredited by the Conférence des Grandes Écoles, ""The MSc ... of the School ..." is a program accredited by the Conférence des grandes écoles that certifies, according to criteria, of the quality of a comprehensive training package to international standards and taught in English."

Be considered candidates who hold a student of the following qualifications:
 First year of Master's degree or equivalent,
 Foreign degree, including Bachelor's degree.

Training must be attested by a diploma respecting the regulations applicable to the school which has received accreditation.

According to the rules, only the schools members of the Conférence des Grandes Écoles may issue the diploma.

References 

Management education
Academic degrees of France